Colston may refer to:

Places

United Kingdom 
Colston, Glasgow
Colston, Pembrokeshire
Colston Bassett, Nottinghamshire
Car Colston, Nottinghamshire

Other uses
Colston (name), a surname and given name (includes a list of people with the name)
Colston-Ariston, a defunct English electrical appliance manufacturer

See also